Akatorea is a genus of South Pacific intertidal spiders first described by Raymond Robert Forster & C. L. Wilton in 1973.  it contains only two species, both found in New Zealand.

Species
 Akatorea gracilis 
 Akatorea otagoensis

References

Araneomorphae genera
Desidae
Spiders of New Zealand
Taxa named by Raymond Robert Forster
Endemic spiders of New Zealand